Epiandrosterone, or isoandrosterone, also known as 3β-androsterone, 3β-hydroxy-5α-androstan-17-one, or 5α-androstan-3β-ol-17-one, is a steroid hormone with weak androgenic activity. It is a metabolite of testosterone and dihydrotestosterone (DHT). It was first isolated in 1931, by Adolf Friedrich Johann Butenandt and Kurt Tscherning. They distilled over 17,000 litres of male urine, from which they got 50 milligrams of crystalline androsterone (most likely mixed isomers), which was sufficient to find that the chemical formula was very similar to estrone.

Epiandrosterone has been shown to naturally occur in most mammals including pigs.

Epiandrosterone is naturally produced by the enzyme 5α-reductase from the adrenal hormone DHEA.  Epiandrosterone can also be produced from the natural steroids androstanediol via 17β-hydroxysteroid dehydrogenase or from androstanedione via 3β-hydroxysteroid dehydrogenase.

See also 
 3β-Androstanediol
 Androstenol
 Androstenone
 Estratetraenol

References

Further reading 

 
 
 
 

5α-Reduced steroid metabolites
Androgens and anabolic steroids
Androstanes